Prague 5, formally the Prague  Municipal District (Městská čast Praha 5), is a second-tier municipality in Prague. The administrative district (správní obvod) of the same name consists of municipal districts Prague 5 and Slivenec.

Prague 5 is one of the largest districts of Prague located at the west side of the Vltava river.
It comprises Smíchov, Radlice, Košíře, Barrandov, Zlíchov, Zličín, Jinonice, Hlubočepy, Motol, Slivenec, Butovice, Chuchle, and Klukovice, as well as a very small part of Malá Strana.

The district was the first one in Prague that offered free wireless internet connection to its citizens.
Prague 5 is growing more important since the reconstruction of Anděl on Smíchov. Now, Anděl is the heart of Prague 5, with thousands of offices and one big shopping mall.  Also, the underground garages in Anděl are the biggest in Prague. Prague 5 is very easily accessible by public transport: Metro line B, dozens of tram lines and buses.

Barrandov 
Barrandov originated as a film producing borough. The film studios, which are active even today, were soon surrounded by many beautiful villas of the First Republic and consequently a small garden town developed. This part of Barrandov is till today  
considered to be a “good address" in Prague. Most important landmarks besides the Barrandov Film Studios are the Barrandov Terraces (Barrandovské Terasy), a former functional luxury restaurant with a splendid view on Vltava river.

New Barrandov is noted for its unique tram stations. The Hlubočepy-Sídliště Barrandov route (tram no.20, 12 or 14) was opened in 2003. Architect Patrik Kotas designed the ultra-modern stations that create a unique feature from the boring, grey walls.

Smíchov 
Textile factories, breweries, railway carriages – the industrial history of Prague was written in Smíchov. Today, the industrial era is recalled only by the sizeable area of the Staropramen Brewery. Smíchov has undergone a remarkable change during the past few years. This workers’ district has been transformed into a district of ultra-modern offices, shopping centres and multiplex cinemas. The central point is the crossroads called Anděl and the Metro station of the same name. How did this place get its name? There once used to be a classicistic building with a brewery, adorned by a painted fresco of an angel which, however, had to make way for the construction of the Prague Metro in 1980.

Malá Strana 
Prague 5 covers also 4% of Malá Strana and it is only the few blocks of buildings which were part of the former village Ujezd, today surrounded by Vítězná Street, Janáčkov Embankment, Petřínská, Mělnická, Plaská Streets, as well as a part of the Vltava near the bridge Most Legí.

Further quarters with special landmarks 
 Radlice and Kosire - quiet centrally located residential areas with ancient mansions and family homes
 Chuchle - noted for its horseracing events on the Prague racecourse Velká Chuchle
 Zličin - big industrial area located at the motorways with many shopping centres
 Slivenec - the přídolí epoch in the Silurian Period of geological time is named for rocks in Přídolí nature reserve near Slivenec.

Education

International schools include:
 Lycée Français de Prague (Smíchov)
 Deutsche Schule Prag (Jinonice)

International relations

Twin towns – Sister cities
Prague 5 district is twinned with:
 Újbuda, Budapest, Hungary

See also
Districts of Prague#Symbols

References

External links 
 More information about Prague 5 and life there may be found in the correspondent article on the Prague Website Citypilot.cz
 Prague 5 - official Homepage

Districts of Prague